Suhani Jalota is an activist working to improve public health in India. She set up the social enterprise Myna Mahila Foundation along with three women, establishing a factory that produces sanitary products and employs poor women in Mumbai by giving them jobs selling these products.

She received the Glamour Woman of the Year award for 2016. Jalota graduated from Duke University in 2016.

Jalota won the 2017 Queen's Young Leader Award for her start-up and its contributions.

Her social enterprise Myna Mahila Foundation was endorsed by Prince Harry and Meghan. It was the only non-UK-based organization to receive donations instead of gifts for the Royal couple. With this new endorsement, the team is now planning to increase the number of women to 25,000. Suhani Jalota has been nominated for the Global Citizen Prize: Cisco Youth Leadership Award.

Awards
 Glamour Woman of the Year 2016

References

External links
Mahila Foundation

Activists from Maharashtra
Indian women activists
Duke University alumni
Living people
Year of birth missing (living people)